Rush Common is a linear protected open space and former common land in Brixton, London, England. It was enclosed in 1806 with the sections fronting public highways protected from development as proscribed land. Most of this land now forms private gardens, forecourts and portions on Brixton Hill are a public park managed by Lambeth Council. There have been several encroachments on the protected land, including small sections of St Matthew's Estate and part of St Matthew's Church. Lambeth Council holds enforcement powers to prevent building of permanent structures on the proscribed land.

History

Rush Common was common land in the parish of Lambeth. The former common land was a triangle bounded by Brixton Hill, Effra Road and Josephine Avenue. It also continued in a salient down Brixton Hill reaching the parish of Streatham.

It was enclosed by the Rush Common Act 1806.

The proscribed land reached a point outside 405 Brixton Road, just to the north of Brixton Station Road. There have been several encroachments on the land that were not permitted by legislation or prevented by private action. In 1821 land was used by the Commissioners for Building New Churches to construct St Matthew's Church. When the Brixton Tate Library was constructed the forecourt was part of the proscribed land and was used to provide public gardens which are now part of Windrush Square.

Local government gained the ability to enforce proscription of the land through the London County Council (General Powers) Act 1947. In the post-war period when land was acquired for council housing estates in the area, the proscribed land that had been private gardens and forecourts was turned into public open space.

Geography
Sections are privately owned (such as Josephine Avenue) whereas the section along Brixton Hill has been purchased by Lambeth London Borough Council and operated as a public open space. Limited building on the land and fragmented ownership means the publicly accessible space now consists of disconnected portions stretching along Brixton Hill.

References

External links
Friends of Rush Common

Parks and open spaces in the London Borough of Lambeth